Wendlandia andamanica is a species of plant in the family Rubiaceae. It is endemic to the Andaman Islands.  It is threatened by habitat loss.

References

andamanica
Flora of the Andaman Islands
Critically endangered plants
Taxonomy articles created by Polbot
Plants described in 1932